Puščava is a small settlement in the Municipality of Mokronog-Trebelno in southeastern Slovenia. It lies on the left bank of the Mirna River northwest of Mokronog. The area is part of the historical region of Lower Carniola. The municipality is now included in the Southeast Slovenia Statistical Region.

References

External links

Puščava on Geopedia

Populated places in the Municipality of Mokronog-Trebelno